Marjorie Taylor (died 14 October 2017) was a Jamaican politician who sat in the Parliament of Jamaica.

References 

2017 deaths
20th-century Jamaican women politicians
20th-century Jamaican politicians
People's National Party (Jamaica) politicians
Members of the House of Representatives of Jamaica
Politicians from Kingston, Jamaica